Route 239 is a north–south highway on the south shore of the Saint Lawrence River. Its northern terminus is at Route 133 in Sainte-Victoire-de-Sorel and its southern terminus is at Saint-Germain-de-Grantham at the junction of Route 122.

Municipalities along Route 239
 Saint-Germain-de-Grantham
 Saint-Eugène
 Saint-Guillaume
 Saint-Marcel-de-Richelieu
 Massueville
 Sainte-Victoire-de-Sorel

See also
 List of Quebec provincial highways

References

External links 
 Route 239 on Google Maps
 Provincial Route Map (Courtesy of the Quebec Ministry of Transportation) 

239